July 17 - Eastern Orthodox Church calendar - July 19

All fixed commemorations below are celebrated on July 31 by Old Calendar.

For July 18th, Orthodox Churches on the Old Calendar commemorate the Saints listed on July 5.

Saints
 Martyr Emilian of Silistra in Bulgaria (363)
 Martyr Markellos (Marcellus, Marcel), roasted alive.
 Martyrs Dasius and Maron, by the sword.
 Martyrs Paul, Valentina and Theia (Theis, Thoe), siblings, at Diocaesarea  (363)  (see also: July 16)
 Martyr Hyacinth of Amastris (4th century)
 Venerable Pambo, hermit of Egypt (4th century)
 Great-martyr Athanasius of Klysma, Egypt (4th century)
 Saint Barlaam, ascetic, of Bald Mountain, near Antioch in Syria (6th century)
 Saint John the Confessor, Metropolitan of Chalcedon (9th century)
 Saint Stephen II of Constantinople, Patriarch of Constantinople (928)

Pre-Schism Western saints
 Martyr Symphorosa of Tivoli near Rome, and her seven martyred sons:(c. 138)
 Crescens, Julian, Nemesius, Primitivus, Justin, Stacteus, and Eugene, under the Emperor Hadrian.
 Saint Marina of Orense (Marina of Águas Santas), a martyr in Orense in Spain (139)
 Virgin martyr Gundenis, martyred in Carthage in North Africa under Septimius Severus (203)
 Saint Maternus, Bishop of Milan in Italy (328)
 Saint Rufillus (Ruffilius), first Bishop of Forlimpopoli in Emilia in Italy (382)
 Saint Philastrius, born in Spain, he became Bishop of Brescia in Italy at the time of the Arian troubles (c. 397)
 Saint Goneri of Brittany, an exile from Britain to Brittany, where he lived as a hermit near Tréguier (6th century)
 Saint Arnulf of Metz, a monk at Lérins, later Bishop of Metz (640)
 Saint Eadburh of Bicester, a daughter of the pagan King Penda, she became a nun (c. 650)
 Saint Theneva (Thenew, Thenova, Dwynwen), the mother of St Kentigern and patron-saint of Glasgow in Scotland together with him (7th century)
 Saint Frederick of Utrecht, Bishop of Utrecht in the Netherlands, martyr bishop (838)
 Saint Minnborinus of Cologne, born in Ireland, he became Abbot of St Martin's in Cologne in Germany (986)

Post-Schism Orthodox saints
 Venerbale John the Much-suffering, of the Kiev Caves (1160)
 Venerable saints Onesiphoros, Pammegistos, Pamphoditis, Paphnutios, Pegon, Polemios, Sozomenos, Soterichos and Photios,  of the "300 Allemagne Saints" of Cyprus (12th century)
 Venerable Pambo the Recluse of the Kiev Far Caves (1241)
 Saint Leontius, founder of Karikhov Monastery, in Novgorod (1492)
 Hieromartyr Cosmas (Kozman), Hieromonk, of Gareji, Georgia (1630)

New martyrs and confessors
 New Hieromartyr Apollinarius (Mosalitinov), Hieromonk of the St. Nicholas Monastery, Verkhoturye (1918)
 New Martyrs Abbess Elizabeth (Romanova), Grand Duchess of Russia, and Nun Barbara, and those with them, at Alapaevsk (1918)  (see also: July 5)

Other commemorations
 Translation of the relics of Venerable Lazarus the Wonderworker, of Mt. Galesion.  (see also: November 7, July 17)
 Icons of the Most Holy Theotokos "Tolga" (1314) and "Kaluga" (1748, 1892)
 Repose of Abbess Mavrikia (1867) and Abbess Zosima (1933), both of Goritsy Convent.

Icon gallery

Notes

References

Sources
 July 18/July 31. Orthodox Calendar (PRAVOSLAVIE.RU).
 July 31 / July 18. HOLY TRINITY RUSSIAN ORTHODOX CHURCH (A parish of the Patriarchate of Moscow).
 July 18. OCA - The Lives of the Saints.
 July 18. The Year of Our Salvation - Holy Transfiguration Monastery, Brookline, Massachusetts. 
 The Autonomous Orthodox Metropolia of Western Europe and the Americas (ROCOR). St. Hilarion Calendar of Saints for the year of our Lord 2004. St. Hilarion Press (Austin, TX). p. 53.
 The Eighteenth Day of the Month of July. Orthodoxy in China.
 July 18. Latin Saints of the Orthodox Patriarchate of Rome.
 The Roman Martyrology. Transl. by the Archbishop of Baltimore. Last Edition, According to the Copy Printed at Rome in 1914. Revised Edition, with the Imprimatur of His Eminence Cardinal Gibbons. Baltimore: John Murphy Company, 1916. pp. 211–212.
 Rev. Richard Stanton. A Menology of England and Wales, or, Brief Memorials of the Ancient British and English Saints Arranged According to the Calendar, Together with the Martyrs of the 16th and 17th Centuries. London: Burns & Oates, 1892. pp. 346–347.

 Greek Sources
 Great Synaxaristes:  18 ΙΟΥΛΙΟΥ. ΜΕΓΑΣ ΣΥΝΑΞΑΡΙΣΤΗΣ.
  Συναξαριστής. 18 Ιουλίου. ECCLESIA.GR. (H ΕΚΚΛΗΣΙΑ ΤΗΣ ΕΛΛΑΔΟΣ). 
  18/07/. Ορθόδοξος Συναξαριστής.

 Russian Sources
  31 июля (18 июля). Православная Энциклопедия под редакцией Патриарха Московского и всея Руси Кирилла (электронная версия). (Orthodox Encyclopedia - Pravenc.ru).
  18 июля по старому стилю / 31 июля по новому стилю. СПЖ "Союз православных журналистов". .
  18 июля (ст.ст.) 31 июля  (нов. ст.). Русская Православная Церковь Отдел внешних церковных связей. (DECR).

July in the Eastern Orthodox calendar